Daniel Cook (born 13 June 1993) is a British male acrobatic gymnast. With partners Connor Bartlett, Gareth Wood and George Wood, Cook achieved silver in the 2014 Acrobatic Gymnastics World Championships. Daniel is also a former member of acrobatic performance troupe and Britains Got Talent winners - Spelbound, joining the troupe in 2012.

References

1993 births
Living people
British acrobatic gymnasts
Male acrobatic gymnasts
Medalists at the Acrobatic Gymnastics World Championships
21st-century British people